Warren Reynolds Porter (March 30, 1861 – August 27, 1927) was a Republican politician from California. He served as the 24th Lieutenant Governor of California from 1907 to 1911.  Porter had grown up in Watsonville, California. A businessman, he co-founded Graniterock, and before that he was board secretary for the Loma Prieta Lumber Company south of Santa Cruz.  He gained popularity in the more liberal Santa Cruz County since the Republican convention was held there. UC Santa Cruz’s Porter College is named after his father's (John T. Porter) cousin, Benjamin F. Porter.

References

Lieutenant Governors of California
People from Watsonville, California
1861 births
1927 deaths
California Republicans